Craugastor melanostictus is a species of frog in the family Craugastoridae.
It is found in Costa Rica and Panama.
Its natural habitat is subtropical or tropical moist montane forests.
It is threatened by habitat loss.

References

melanostictus
Amphibians described in 1875
Taxonomy articles created by Polbot